The Skagway News is a newspaper published once a month in January, then twice a month for the rest of the year in Skagway, Alaska.

A different paper by a similar title, The Skaguay News or at various times Skaguay Weekly News and Skaguay Daily News, was published in Skagway from 1897 to the early 1900s.

The present-day Skagway News was first established in 1978 by William J. “Jeff” Brady. It merged from 1978 to 1979 with the Haines-based Chilkat Valley News to form the Lynn Canal News, and then resumed publishing as a separate paper in 1982.

Larry Persily, whose friend had founded the paper, acquired it in April 2019. In 2019 Persily was seeking to give the newspaper to a new owner for free. Persily chose Melinda Munson and Gretchen Wehmhoff, two women from Chugiak, Alaska, to take over the paper.  Munson and Wehmhoff took over March 3, 2020, just days before a state of emergency due to the COVID-19 pandemic was officially declared.

The paper is usually available on the second and fourth Friday of the month.

References

External links 
 Official site
 Chronicling America page

1978 establishments in Alaska
Municipality of Skagway Borough, Alaska
Newspapers published in Alaska
Publications established in 1978
Semi-monthly newspapers